Alexander Mark Tai (born October 22, 1966) is the former team principal of the Virgin Racing Formula E team and former team principal of Virgin Racing Formula One team.

Career
Tai was named as the Team Principal of Virgin Racing Formula One team at the team's launch in December 2009. Less than a month later, however, he left the position, saying that he was focused on "finding new opportunities and the challenge of starting new ventures." He was replaced by the team's Sporting Director, John Booth.

References

1966 births
Living people
Virgin Group
Formula One team principals
Formula E people